Muḥammad ibn Abī Saʿīd ibn ʿAqīl, possibly only seven years old, was among the martyrs of Banu Hashim in the Battle of Karbala.

Name 
Some Shia scholars of Rijal have mentioned his name as Muhammad ibn Sa'id and some others have recorded his name as Muhammad ibn Abi Sa'd, but some have considered Abu Sa'id, the kunya of Abd Allah ibn Aqil and have considered a possibility that Muhammad ibn Sa'id would have actually been the same Muhammad ibn Abd Allah ibn Aqil.

In the Battle of Karbala 
After the martyrdom of Husayn ibn Ali, the young Muhammad ibn Abi Sa'id ibn Aqil came out of the tents and looked around anxiously and fearfully. One of the soldiers of Umar ibn Sa'd called Luqayt ibn Ayas (Nashir) al-Juhani attacked him and killed him with a strike.

In the Ziyarah al-Shuhada, he has been mentioned as, "Peace be upon Muhammad ibn Abi Sa'id ibn 'Aqil and may God curse his murderer, Luqayt ibn Nashir al-Juhani."

References 

People killed at the Battle of Karbala
600s births
680 deaths

Year of birth uncertain
Husayn ibn Ali

Hussainiya